The Church of St. Mary Magdalene (also known as SMM) is a parish of the Anglican Church of Canada located in Toronto. It is named for Jesus' companion, Mary Magdalene, and is famous for its association with composer Healey Willan, who was organist and choirmaster for over four decades. In 2013, SMM celebrated its 125th Anniversary.

Theology
As an Anglo-Catholic parish, St. Mary Magdalene always celebrates the eucharist as the central act of worship. This has historically been done at St. Mary Magdalene's in a liturgical style reflecting the convergence of Roman Catholic and Anglican influences. In 1919, the church shifted more towards Roman-style parish life; the reverend H. Griffin Hiscocks began hearing private confessions. During this period, the church began to use incense and installed a large statue of the Blessed Virgin Mary (now in the south aisle of the church). Newspaper accounts of the time relate that the installation was controversial. A chip in the statue's toe shows evidence of a hammer attack made by those hostile to Catholicism.

Founding and development
The church was founded in 1888 by a group from the nearby Church of St. Matthias led by the Reverend Charles Darling. The church's choice of patron was probably an homage to the Church of St Mary Magdalene, Paddington, where Darling had served as assistant. The church building was designed by the rector's brother—Toronto architect Frank Darling. 

The exterior was begun in 1888, added to in 1896 and completed in 1908. The choir loft was added in the 1920s. The sanctuary was extensively remodeled in 1963 by Rambush & Company of New York. In 1993, a substantial addition to the building added spaces for instruction, meeting, and church administration. In 2008, another renovation to the liturgical space opened up windows that had been closed in the 1920s.

In 1966, the church became one of the first Anglican churches in Canada whose priests gave the Solemn Mass facing the congregation, as became common among Catholics following a Second Vatican Council.

"In 1967 the Rev'd Mountain "Monty" Hutt became rector ... [and] organized the first outdoor procession of the Blessed Sacrament in 1974."

Among other causes of fame of the parish during his time was his being the brother of William Hutt, an actor in the Stratford Festival who also toured nationally and internationally.

Over the years, St. Mary Magdalene's has accumulated other pieces of sacred art. A Rood Cross hangs from the chancel arch to commemorate the parish war dead of World War I. It was designed by architect William Rae, modelled by Frances Loring and originally painted by Frank Johnston (one of the Group of Seven). Sylvia Hahn painted a pastoral scene of a young Jesus in the north aisle.  Hahn also painted the triptych behind the Lady Altar in the south aisle. Devotional stations with statues of St. Benedict, St. Joseph, St. Mary Magdalene and others are spread throughout the church. A modern painting by Lynn Donoghue hanging near the baptismal font explores the challenges of faith in the modern age.

Music

St. Mary Magdalene's is particularly well known for excellence in sacred music. In 1940, Robertson Davies reported in the magazine Saturday Night that there were only two things worth doing in Toronto, seeing the Chinese Collection at the Royal Ontario Museum and listening to St. Mary Magdalene's choirs. This owed much to the work of Healey Willan who came to the parish in 1921 and remained as the organist and choirmaster until shortly before his death in 1968. Willan composed music for St. Mary Magdalene's liturgies and performance elsewhere that have lasting use and influence. He was at one time best known internationally as the only composer outside England who was asked for and provided music for the coronation of Queen Elizabeth II in 1953. He was also an accomplished organist famous for his improvisational skill. He once remarked, "You have a sense of home, absolute completion... doing the work you want to do and the work you feel you can do."

This legacy of excellence in sacred music is demonstrated by the fact that the musical services of Tenebrae celebrated in Holy Week are the best attended services of the year.  One distinctive characteristic of the music tradition at SMM is the division of the choir into a "Gallery Choir" which sings polyphonic music from a balcony in the west end of the church and a "Ritual Choir" that specializes in performing Gregorian Chant from choir stalls in the chancel.

Variety of worship
A variety of worship takes place at SMM: daily Masses, Morning Prayer, and Evening Prayer, as well as Solemn Masses on Sundays and important feasts of the Christian calendar. Far from being limited to traditional language liturgies, however, the parish also celebrates contemporary language liturgies based on the Canadian Book of Alternative Services. SMM's role in the development of liturgy in the Anglican Church of Canada can also be seen in claim that the "reordered" 1962 Eucharistic Rite contained in the BAS was partially inspired by developments at SMM. For some time the parish had experimented by literally cutting and pasting pages of the Canadian Book of Common Prayer into the Anglican Missal. The resulting "reordered rite" combined the sequence of Roman usage, Canadian BCP prayers, and supplemental liturgical material (e.g. minor propers) from more ancient sources.

Cultural references
SMM was part of the composite that Robertson Davies used to form "St. Aidan's" in his novel The Cunning Man. Davies attended Mass there while still a Presbyterian and a student at Upper Canada College. The church is also mentioned in Marian Engel's "The Glassy Sea."

Notable people
On 3 July 1989, Queen Elizabeth The Queen Mother visited the church, participated in the Solemn Mass, and unveiled a national historic plaque to the memory of Healey Willan.

See also
List of Anglican churches in Toronto

References

External links
Official website
Ship of Fools "Mystery Worshipper" report (2001)

Mary
Mary
Mary
Churches completed in 1908
Darling and Pearson buildings